There were three 1860 by-elections in the  electorate:
 January 1860 Suburbs of Auckland by-election
 April 1860 Suburbs of Auckland by-election
 August 1860 Suburbs of Auckland by-election